Éric Alibert (born 1958) is a French painter, specialising in nature and animals. He is also the author of books dedicated to several important natural sites of the world. He uses watercolour, oil, acrylic as well as other techniques including the use of gold leaves.

His works are inspired by regions such as the main European national parks, as well as Syria, Namibia, Venezuela and Japan. There is also an influence of poetic sources, such as Philippe Jaccottet, Novalis and Marguerite Yourcenar and of plastic artists like  Soulages, Viollet-le-Duc and Rembrandt Bugatti, to whom Alibert dedicated .

Éric Alibert received the gold medal of the "artistes animaliers français ((ref.)), has been awarded by the Fondation de la Vocation and is member of the U.S. Guild of Natural Science Illustrators.

His works have been displayed in several exhibitions, including in the Museum d'histoire naturelle of Paris and of Geneva. There are owned by private and public collections. In 2012, the Castle of Saint-Maurice, Valais, Switzerland organises an important exposition of his most recent creations : Exhibition "Regards croisés Orient-Occident autour d'Eric Alibert"

Publications 
 Voyage d'un peintre autour du Mont-Blanc, éditions Slatkine, 2011
 Nature souveraine - Le Parc national suisse, with Pierre Rouyer, éditions du Midi, 2008, 176 p.
 Couleurs du Venezuela. Des Caraïbes à l'Orénoque, bilingual French-Spanish, éditions Somogy, 2007, 173 p.
 Carnet d'un naturaliste amateur en Lubéron, with Serge Bec, 2007, 125 p.
 Parc naturel régional des Monts d'Ardèche, with and audio-DC, 2007
 Namibie: De l'Okavango aux chutes Victoria. Carnet de voyages dans le Caprivi, éditions Slatkine, 2006, 178 p.
 Archipel des Cyclades, with François Arvanitis, Jacques Anglès & Anne-Sophie Bourhis-Pozzoli, éditions Nathan, 2005
 Couleurs de Syrie, éditions Somogy, 2004, 150 p.
 Parc naturel régional du massif des Bauges, éditions Gallimard Loisirs, 2001
 Léman mon île, éditions Slatkine, 2000
 Carnets Naturalistes en Provence, éditions Nathan, 2000
 La Cote d'Opale, éditions Gallimard, 1998
 Carnets Naturalistes autour du Mont Blanc, with Daniel Aiagno & Jean-François Desmet, éditions Nathan 1996
 Guide du jeune naturaliste à la montagne, éditions Delachaux et Niestlé, 1993
 Le grand livre des espèces disparues, with Jean-Christophe Balouet, foreword by Jacques-Yves Cousteau, éditions Ouest-France, 1989, 197 p.

References

External links 
 Eric Alibert
 

1958 births
20th-century French painters
20th-century French male artists
French male painters
21st-century French painters
21st-century French male artists
Living people
Place of birth missing (living people)